Ratata could refer to:
Ratata (band), a Swedish pop band
Ratata, their eponymous debut
Ratata (Arno Hintjens album), an album by Arno Hintjens
The Scandinavian name for the cartoon dog Rantanplan
A misspelling of the name of the Pokémon Rattata

fr:Rattata et Rattatac#Rattata